Arnold Paul Schulbach (later Arnold Paul Süvalep; 18 April 1888, in Avinurme Parish (now Mustvee Parish), Kreis Dorpat – 23 June 1968, in Tallinn) was an Estonian politician and journalist. He was a member of the I, II, III, and IV Riigikogu.

From 1929 until 1932 he was Secretary of IV Riigikogu. His son was theatre director, actor, poet, translator, and songwriter Kulno Süvalep.

References

1888 births
1968 deaths
People from Mustvee Parish
People from Kreis Dorpat
Estonian Labour Party politicians
National Centre Party (Estonia) politicians
Members of the Estonian Constituent Assembly
Members of the Riigikogu, 1920–1923
Members of the Riigikogu, 1923–1926
Members of the Riigikogu, 1926–1929
Members of the Riigikogu, 1929–1932
Estonian journalists